is a railway station in the city of Yurihonjō, Akita Prefecture,  Japan, operated by JR East.

Lines

Station layout
The station has one side platform serving a single bi-directional track. The station is staffed.

History
Iwaki-Minato Station opened on December 1, 2001.

Passenger statistics
In fiscal 2018, the station was used by an average of 101 passengers daily (boarding passengers only).

Surrounding area
 
former Iwaki Town Hall

See also
List of railway stations in Japan

References

External links

 JR East Station information 

Railway stations in Japan opened in 2001
Railway stations in Akita Prefecture
Uetsu Main Line
Yurihonjō